Sergei Raad (born August 3, 1982) is a Russian footballer who currently plays for FC JAX Destroyers in the USL Premier Development League.

Career

Youth and College
Raad's birth name is Sergei Kolomeites. He moved to the United States in 1995 after his Russian club team came to Orlando, Florida to play in a tournament; he was sponsored by a local family and obtained a student visa so he could learn English, and eventually took on the surname of his adoptive family, Raad. He attended Oviedo High School and played college soccer at Furman University from 2000 to 2004, where he appeared in 62 games, notching 20 goals and 29 assists.

Professional
Raad turned professional in 2004 when he joined the now-defunct A-League team, the Calgary Mustangs. With the Mustangs he played in 20 games, scoring 4 goals and contributing 2 assists, before being released at the end of the season when the team folded.

He spent the early months of 2005 training with Zenit St. Petersburg, but was not offered a contract by the Russian team, and instead returned to the United States, playing for Central Florida Kraze in the USL Premier Development League.

He trained with Major League Soccer side New England Revolution during the second half of 2005, and must have impressed some scouts, as he signed a developmental contract with the Kansas City Wizards on April 1, 2006. He played in one MLS game during the season, before being waived at the end of the 2006 season.

During early 2007 Raad was training with the Seattle Sounders, but eventually returned home to play PDL soccer with the Central Florida Kraze again in 2007. After a couple of years out of the game in 2008 and 2009 Raad embarked on a third stint with the Kraze in 2010; he scored his first ever goal for the team in their 2010 season opener, a 3-1 win over Fort Lauderdale Schulz Academy.

In 2011, Raad signed with the new PDL expansion team, FC Jax Destroyers.

References

External links
 Sergei Raad profile at MLSNet
 Infosport profile

1982 births
Living people
American soccer players
Sporting Kansas City players
A-League (1995–2004) players
Calgary Mustangs (USL) players
Orlando City U-23 players
Furman University alumni
Furman Paladins men's soccer players
FC JAX Destroyers players
Russian emigrants to the United States
Major League Soccer players
USL League Two players
Association football midfielders
Soccer players from Orlando, Florida